Miloš Šumonja (23 September 1918 – 22 March 2006) was a Croatian Serb general of the Yugoslav People's Army (JNA), who served as the Chief of the General Staff of the JNA from 15 June 1967 to 5 January 1970.

References

Literature

1918 births
2006 deaths
People from Karlovac County
Serbs of Croatia
Chiefs of Staff of the Yugoslav People's Army
Yugoslav Partisans members
Serbian generals
Generals of the Yugoslav People's Army
League of Communists of Yugoslavia politicians
Recipients of the Order of the People's Hero
Burials at Belgrade New Cemetery